Willie Lloyd Anderson Jr. (born January 8, 1966) is an American former professional basketball player. During his pro club career, Anderson played nine seasons in the NBA, and three seasons in the EuroLeague. He was named to the 1988–89 NBA season's All-Rookie First Team. While he was a member of the Greek Basket League club AEK Athens, he played in the 1998 EuroLeague Final.

College career
After playing high school basketball at East Atlanta High, Anderson played college basketball at the University of Georgia, with the Georgia Bulldogs, from 1984 to 1988. In his junior season, Anderson averaged 15.9 points, 4.1 rebounds, 5.0 assists, 1.4 steals, and 1.6 blocks per game, in 30 games played. During his senior season, Anderson averaged 16.7 points, 5.1 rebounds, 4.0 assists, 1.9 steals, and 1.4 blocks per game, in 35 games played, and he was named to the SEC's All-Conference Team.

Professional career
After attending and playing college basketball at the University of Georgia, Anderson was selected by the San Antonio Spurs, with the 10th overall pick of the 1988 NBA draft. Anderson was selected to the 1989 NBA All-Rookie Team. During the 1990 NBA Playoffs, Anderson averaged playoff-career-highs of 20.5 points, 5.4 rebounds, and 5.2 assists per game respectively. The Spurs advanced past the Denver Nuggets in the first round, before losing to the eventual Western Conference champion Portland Trail Blazers, in a hard-fought seven game playoff series. 

Anderson played for the Spurs until the 1994–95 season. He spent 1995–96 season with the Toronto Raptors, after he was selected in the 1995 expansion draft. He also played with the New York Knicks that season. Anderson spent the 1996–97 season playing in Greece, where he played with the Greek Basket League club Olympiacos Piraeus, and with the NBA's Miami Heat.

He moved to the Greek club AEK Athens, for the 1997–98 season. He helped AEK make it to the EuroLeague's 1998 Final, which they lost to the Italian League club Virtus Bologna, by a score of 58–44. Anderson signed with the Israeli Super League club Maccabi Tel Aviv, for the 1998–99 season. However, he was waived by the club at the beginning of the season. After signing with the club, he declared that season would be his last season in professional basketball, and after he was waived by the club, he did in fact retire from playing pro club basketball.

National team career
Anderson won a silver medal with Team USA at the 1987 Pan American Games. He also won a bronze medal at the 1988 Summer Olympics, where he played alongside future NBA players Hersey Hawkins, Stacey Augmon, Dan Majerle, Mitch Richmond, Charles Smith, and future Spurs teammate, David Robinson.

Personal life
Anderson is the older brother of former NBA player Shandon Anderson, and the father of former University of Tennessee at Chattanooga Lady Mocs player Alex Anderson.

NBA career statistics

Regular season 

|-
| style="text-align:left;"|
| style="text-align:left;"|San Antonio
| 81 || 79 || 33.8 || .498 || .190 || .775 || 5.1 || 4.6 || 1.9 || 0.8 || 18.6
|-
| style="text-align:left;"| 
| style="text-align:left;"|San Antonio
| 82 || 81 || 34.0 || .492 || .269 || .748 || 4.5 || 4.4 || 1.4 || 0.7 || 15.7
|-
| style="text-align:left;"| 
| style="text-align:left;"|San Antonio
| 75 || 75 || 34.6 || .457 || .200 || .798 || 4.7 || 4.8 || 1.1 || 0.8 || 14.4
|-
| style="text-align:left;"| 
| style="text-align:left;"|San Antonio
| 57 || 55 || 33.1 || .455 || .232 || .775 || 5.3 || 5.3 || 0.9 || 0.9 || 13.1
|-
| style="text-align:left;"| 
| style="text-align:left;"|San Antonio
| 38 || 7 || 14.7 || .430 || .125 || .786 || 1.5 || 2.1 || 0.4 || 0.2 || 4.8
|-
| style="text-align:left;"| 
| style="text-align:left;"|San Antonio
| 80 || 79 || 31.1 || .471 || .324 || .848 || 3.0 || 4.3 || 0.9 || 0.6 || 11.9
|-
| style="text-align:left;"| 
| style="text-align:left;"|San Antonio
| 38 || 11 || 14.6 || .469 || .158 || .732 || 1.4 || 1.4 || 0.7 || 0.3 || 4.9
|-
| style="text-align:left;"| 
| style="text-align:left;"|Toronto
| 49 || 42 || 31.9 || .440 || .305 || .856 || 3.8 || 3.0 || 1.2 || 1.0 || 12.4
|-
| style="text-align:left;"| 
| style="text-align:left;"|New York
| 27 || 2 || 18.4 || .421 || .200 || .613 || 2.2 || 1.8 || 0.6 || 0.3 || 5.0
|-
| style="text-align:left;"| 
| style="text-align:left;"|Miami
| 28 || 1 || 10.8 || .453 || .421 || .850 || 1.5 || 1.2 || 0.5 || 0.1 || 3.0
|- class="sortbottom"
| style="text-align:center;" colspan="2"| Career
| 555 || 432 || 28.8 || .471 || .266 || .786 || 3.8 || 3.8 || 1.1 || 0.6 || 12.2

Playoffs 

|-
|style="text-align:left;"|1990
|style="text-align:left;"|San Antonio
|10||10||37.5||.518||.400||.806||5.4||5.2||0.9||0.4||20.5
|-
|style="text-align:left;"|1991
|style="text-align:left;"|San Antonio
|4||4||39.8||.485||.200||.615||4.3||4.8||1.5||0.5||19.0
|-
|style="text-align:left;"|1993
|style="text-align:left;"|San Antonio
|10||0||21.9||.451||.545||.882||2.3||2.8||0.9||0.2||9.5
|-
|style="text-align:left;"|1994
|style="text-align:left;"|San Antonio
|4||4||26.5||.378||1.000||.571||2.0||3.0||1.3||0.5||8.3
|-
|style="text-align:left;"|1995
|style="text-align:left;"|San Antonio
|11||0||8.8||.450||.000||.667||1.1||0.9||0.5||0.0||1.8
|-
|style="text-align:left;"|1996
|style="text-align:left;"|New York
|4||0||16.0||.318||.167||.857||2.3||0.3||1.0||0.0||5.3
|-
|style="text-align:left;"|1997
|style="text-align:left;"|Miami
|9||0||13.3||.367||.250||.900||1.9||0.6||0.4||0.2||3.7
|- class="sortbottom"
| style="text-align:center;" colspan="2"| Career
| 52 || 18 || 21.9 || .464 || .333 || .785 || 2.7 || 2.4 || 0.8 || 0.2 || 9.3

References

External links
Willie Anderson NBA Stats @ basketball-reference.com
Fibaeurope.com profile
Eurobasket.com profile

1967 births
Living people
AEK B.C. players
American expatriate basketball people in Canada
American expatriate basketball people in Greece
American expatriate basketball people in Israel
American men's basketball players
Basketball players at the 1987 Pan American Games
Basketball players at the 1988 Summer Olympics
Basketball players from Atlanta
Basketball players from South Carolina
Georgia Bulldogs basketball players
Maccabi Tel Aviv B.C. players
Medalists at the 1987 Pan American Games
Medalists at the 1988 Summer Olympics
Miami Heat players
New York Knicks players
Olympiacos B.C. players
Olympic bronze medalists for the United States in basketball
Pan American Games medalists in basketball
Pan American Games silver medalists for the United States
San Antonio Spurs draft picks
San Antonio Spurs players
Shooting guards
Small forwards
Sportspeople from Greenville, South Carolina
Toronto Raptors expansion draft picks
Toronto Raptors players
United States men's national basketball team players